Cold Hanworth is a village and civil parish in the West Lindsey district of Lincolnshire, England. It is combined with Hackthorn to form the parish council of Hackthorn and Cold Hanworth.

The cruciform church of All Saints was rebuilt in 1861, replacing one of medieval origin. The Grade II listed building was converted to a private house and renamed Old Church House in 1966. It has been disused since 1973. A further listed building is a farm cottage on Green Lane.

At the south of the village are the earthwork remains of Cold Hanworth medieval village. This settlement was established in the 11th century but abandoned by the 18th.

Cold Hanworth Forge is a working forge and blacksmithing school.

References

External links

Civil parishes in Lincolnshire
Villages in Lincolnshire
West Lindsey District